Dario Đaković (born 20 April 1987) is an Austrian footballer.

References

1987 births
Living people
Austrian footballers
Austrian Football Bundesliga players
FC Wacker Innsbruck (2002) players

Association football defenders
Yugoslav emigrants to Austria
Austrian people of Bosnia and Herzegovina descent
WSG Tirol players